Verlon Lee Walker (March 7, 1929 – March 24, 1971) was an American catcher in minor league baseball and a coach for the Chicago Cubs of Major League Baseball from 1961 through 1970. He was also known as Rube Walker, nicknamed after his more famous older brother Albert, who preceded him as a catcher in the Chicago farm system. Albert played 11 seasons in the Major Leagues with the Cubs and Brooklyn Dodgers, and was an MLB pitching coach for three clubs, most notably the New York Mets.

Born in Lenoir, North Carolina, Verlon Walker never rose higher than eleven total games in the Double-A Texas League and Southern Association as a minor league catcher (1948–50; 1953–61). He turned to managing in 1957 as the playing skipper of the Paris Lakers of the Class D Midwest League, where he enjoyed his finest season as a hitter, batting .321 with 20 home runs.

In 1961, he was appointed to the Cubs' College of Coaches, a rotating team of instructors and "head coaches" created as an experimental alternative to the traditional baseball hierarchy of a manager and a coaching staff. He was a member of this group for the five years of its existence, then was retained as the Cubs' bullpen coach when Leo Durocher was named manager for 1966. However, that year Walker discovered he was suffering from acute myeloid leukemia. But a recurrence of leukemia caused his death on March 24, 1971, in Chicago at the age of 42.

Upon his death, the Cubs established the Verlon "Rube" Walker Leukemia Center at Northwestern Memorial Hospital, which still exists today as the Rube Walker Blood Center.

References

 Spink, C.C. Johnson, ed., The Baseball Register, 1965-68 editions. St. Louis: The Sporting News.
 Thorn, John, and Palmer, Peter, eds.., Total Baseball, New York: Warner Books, 1989.

External links

 Coach's page in Retrosheet
 "A Baseball Love Story," tribute blog by daughter Leigh Ann Walker Young

1929 births
1971 deaths
Baseball catchers
Baseball coaches from North Carolina
Baseball players from North Carolina
Chicago Cubs coaches
Deaths from cancer in Illinois
Deaths from leukemia
Des Moines Bruins players
Lumberton Cubs players
Macon Peaches players
Major League Baseball bullpen coaches
Major League Baseball first base coaches
Major League Baseball third base coaches
Nashville Vols players
Paris Lakers players
People from Lenoir, North Carolina
Pueblo Bruins players
San Antonio Missions managers
San Antonio Missions players
Sioux Falls Canaries players
Topeka Owls players
Wenatchee Chiefs players